Abenteuer Europa is a 1994 German video game developed by Ego Software and published by Sozialdemokratische Partei Deutschlands for DOS.

The SPD had the point-and-click adventure produced in the run-up to the 1994 European Parliament elections in order to reach younger voters. 40,000 copies of the game were originally produced. The SPD ended up winning 40 of the 99 German seats in the European Parliament.

References 

1994 video games
Adventure games
Advergames
DOS games
DOS-only games
Europe-exclusive video games
Political video games
Propaganda video games
Social Democratic Party of Germany
Video games developed in Germany
Video games set in 1994
Video games set in Europe
Egosoft games